Malvern Hills may refer to:

Malvern Hills,a range of hills in England
Malvern Hills Conservators, a body set up to manage the Malvern Hills
Malvern Hills (district), district council in Worcestershire, England
Malvern Hills AONB (Malvern Hills Area of Outstanding Natural Beauty), on the border of Herefordshire and Worcestershire, England